Joshua Mann-Rea (born 19 February 1981) is a rugby union player. He currently plays for the ACT Brumbies in the southern hemisphere Super Rugby competition. Late in his career, he made his international debut from the bench in Australia's 2014 Championship win against South Africa in Perth. He plays in the position of Hooker.

He is 181 cm tall and weights 105 kg. Mann-Rea made his Super Rugby debut for the Waratahs against the Stormers in 2012 during round 13. He previously spent several seasons playing in Japan with Top League club Kyuden Voltex.

Mann-Rea was named in the Brumbies Extended Playing Squad for the 2013 Super Rugby season

Super Rugby statistics

References

External links
Player detail: Josh Mann-Rea

Rugby union hookers
1981 births
Living people
New South Wales Waratahs players
Australian rugby union players
Australia international rugby union players
ACT Brumbies players
Kyuden Voltex players
New South Wales Country Eagles players
Canberra Vikings players
Expatriate rugby union players in Japan
Australian expatriate sportspeople in Japan
Australian expatriate rugby union players
Rugby union players from New South Wales